Víctor Yturbe (born Víctor Manuel De Anda Iturbe; May 8, 1936 – November 28, 1987) was a Mexican singer under the stage name "El Pirulí".

Career
Yturbe was born in Mexico City.  In the 1960s, he made his first contact with the artistic world, working as an aquatic clown in a water skiing show in Acapulco. After a spinal injury, he stayed in the Hotel Posada Vallarta in March 1964 where he started to sing professionally in the hotel's bar. Out of this experience came his first compositions, and he soon recorded his first album, entitled "Noches en el Posada Vallarta", which included the popular track "Puerto Vallarta". His nickname "Pirulí" was because, due to his slim figure, he resembled a pirulí (a type of lollipop famous in Latin America). Throughout his extensive career he recorded numerous albums, always with the collaboration of Chamin Correa, better known as the Primer Requinto de América, that have proven very successful in the 18 years since his death. 

Victor sings to actress Veronica Castro in his song Veronica.

Yturbe left behind as his legacy numerous recordings, which years later, and digitally remastered, would be used by well-known musicians of Latin romantic music on a tribute CD with participants such as Cristian Castro (on the track Mil besos); Luis Fonsi (on the track Historia de un Amor) and Pandora (on the track Verdad Amarga), among many others.

Death
Yturbe was murdered on November 28, 1987 in Atizapan de Zaragoza. He was shot after he opened the door to his house. The cause was never established and no one has ever been charged with his killing.

See also
List of unsolved murders

Albums
1988:  Canta A Roberto Cantoral
1981:  Ni Retiro Ni Regreso
1978:  De Vez En Vez
1976:  Noches En La Posada Vallarta
1976:  Condición
1976:  Por Si Acaso Me Recuerdas
1972:  Simplemente
1972:  Solo Para Adultos
1971:  Te Pido Y Te Ruego

References

1936 births
1987 deaths
20th-century Mexican male singers
Deaths by firearm in Mexico
Male murder victims
Mexican murder victims
Mexican people of Basque descent
Unsolved murders in Mexico